A snub, cut or slight is a refusal to recognise an acquaintance by ignoring them, avoiding them or pretending not to know them.  For example, a failure to greet someone may be considered a snub.

In Awards and Lists 
For awards, the term "snub" is usually used to refer to a work or person that fails to be nominated or win award, with whether or not a person or work was legitimately snubbed for an award has often been subject for public debate. The term Snub has also been used in relation to lists, such as the NBA 75th Anniversary Team. Many of the most notable people and works have failed to be nominated or win a major award for example Alfred Hitchcock, Stanley Kubrick, and Spike Lee never won best director at the Oscars despite being nominated five, four, and one time respectively, Glenn Close, Peter O'Toole, and Cicely Tyson were also notable for having never won an Oscar related to acting despite each of them having multiple nominations. Among films, Citizen Kane, The Princess Bride, E.T. the Extra-Terrestrial, and The Shining were not nominated for the best picture, while The Searchers received no Oscar nominations despite each being considered one of the best films of all time. Goodfellas, Brokeback Mountain, and Saving Private Ryan are also considered snubs for not winning the award for best picture despite each being nominated.

For the Emmy Awards, The Fresh Prince of Bel-Air and The Wire were never nominated for best comedy and best drama despite their critical acclaim. The Late Late Show with Craig Ferguson, Drunk History and the Seinfeld episode "The Soup Nazi", are also generally considered major snubs from the Emmys as well. Angela Lansbury, Sandra Oh, Don Cheadle, Steve Carell, Anthony Anderson, and Hugh Laurie are also known for having never won an acting award at the Emmys despite each being nominated at least ten times. Michael Landon was notably also never nominated for an acting Emmy despite his popular appeal.

Some have suggested that some athletes have been snubbed from winning season-ending sports awards despite having great years statistically such as Jim Brown failing to win the 1956 Heisman Trophy and Ted Williams failing to win the 1941 and 1942 American League MVP award.

See also
 Boycott
 Ostracism
 Outcast
 Send to Coventry
 Phubbing
 Shunning
 Silent treatment
 Social rejection
 Cancel culture

References

Etiquette
Interpersonal relationships
Shunning
Social rejection